Birofeld is a village (selo) in Birobidzhansky District of the Jewish Autonomous Oblast, Russia.  It is an early Jewish settlement, which was founded in 1928 when a large collective farm was established in the area. In 2003, a Jewish Book Festival took place here. In 2006, Chief Rabbi of the Jewish Autonomous Oblast, Mordechai Scheiner, visited Birofeld with the Jewish community of Birobidzhan.  As of 2007, some of the original Jewish settlers still lived here.

See also
Jews and Judaism in the Jewish Autonomous Oblast

References

Rural localities in the Jewish Autonomous Oblast
Historic Jewish communities
Populated places established in 1928